Barbara Dianne Savage (born 1953) is an author, historian, and the Geraldine R. Segal Professor of American Social Thought and Professor of Africana Studies at the University of Pennsylvania. She teaches undergraduate and graduate and courses that focus on 20th century African American history, the history of American religious and social reform movements, the history of the relationship between media and politics and black women's political and intellectual history.

Savage graduated from the University of Virginia and the Georgetown University Law Center. She holds a Ph.D. in history from Yale University. Before entering graduate school, Savage worked in Washington, D.C., as a Congressional staff member and as a member of the staff of the Children's Defense Fund. During graduate school, she served as Director of Federal Relations, Office of the General Counsel at Yale University.

In 2017, Savage was appointed the Harmsworth Visiting Professor of American History (established 1922) at the University of Oxford.

Works
 Broadcasting Freedom: Radio, War, and the Politics of Race, 1938-1948 (University of North Carolina Press, 1999) 
 ed. Women and Religion in the African Diaspora with R. Marie Griffith (Johns Hopkins University Press, 2006)
 Your Spirits Walk Beside Us: The Politics of Black Religion (Harvard University Press, 2008)

References

1953 births
Living people
University of Pennsylvania people
University of Virginia alumni
Georgetown University Law Center alumni
Yale University alumni
African-American women academics
African-American academics
American women academics
21st-century African-American people
21st-century African-American women
20th-century African-American people
20th-century African-American women